John of Denmark (21 February 151811 August 1532) was the eldest child and first of four sons born to the King and Queen of Denmark and Norway, Christian II and Isabella of Austria.

Biography
Born in Copenhagen, John was named after his paternal grandfather, King John. When John was one year old, his mother gave birth to twin boys, Philip Ferdinand and Maximilian, who both died within a year. He also had two younger sisters, Dorothea, the future Electress of the Palatinate, and Christina, the future Duchess of Lorraine.

King Christian II was deposed in 1523 by his uncle, who took the throne as King Frederick I. During the years of their exile, John and his family led a relatively humble life in the city of Lierre (now Lier, Flanders, Belgium) in the Duchy of Brabant of the Habsburg Netherlands, waiting for the military help of John's maternal uncle, Holy Roman Emperor Charles V.

At the beginning of 1532, John's father went to Oslo in an attempt to persuade the Riksråd (National Council of Norway) to recognize John as the rightful Heir to the Throne and to afterwards crown him as the next King of Norway. Meanwhile, the Emperor took John to Regensburg, then a Free Imperial City in Bavaria. He was undoubtedly meant to play a role in Habsburg politics (as the eldest grandson of Philip the Handsome, though posthumous), but died on 11 August at Charles's house in Regensburg. He was buried in St. Peter's Abbey in Ghent, also in the Habsburg Netherlands, but his remains were exhumed and transported to St. Canute's Cathedral in Odense, Denmark, in 1883. He is portrayed as gifted and intelligent, capable of running a country.

Notes

References

External links 

 

1518 births
1532 deaths
Danish princes
Heirs apparent who never acceded
Burials at St. Canute's Cathedral
Sons of kings
Children of Christian II of Denmark
Royal reburials
Royalty who died as children